Manuel González (born 16 March 1991) is an Argentine professional footballer who plays as a centre-back for Italian  club Trapani.

Career
González began playing for All Boys in 2008, remaining for two years. 2010 saw him join General Lamadrid, which preceded spells with Atlanta, Deportivo Español and Ferro Carril Oeste. In 2014, González made four appearances for Regatas in Torneo Argentino B. He was on the move soon after, signing contracts with San Jorge and Unión Aconquija. Torneo Federal B's Villa Mitre signed González in 2015. Four goals in thirty-seven fixtures followed across 2015 and the succeeding 2016 Torneo Federal A season after promotion. He made his debut for Estudiantes in September 2016 versus Villa San Carlos, after joining in June.

González had a short spell with Pacífico in 2017, prior to joining Argentine Primera División side Tigre in July 2017. However, he was loaned out to Acassuso of Primera B Metropolitana in the following months. He was selected in two encounters for Acassuso during 2017–18 as they reached the promotion play-offs, where they were eliminated by UAI Urquiza. After then returning to Tigre, González left Argentine football for the first time in 2018 after signing for Costa Rica's San Carlos of Liga FPD. He signed with Norwegian 2. divisjon club Egersunds IK on 19 January 2019. His bow came in an away win against Vidar on 22 April.

González netted his first Egersunds IK goal on 18 May in a 4–0 league win over Sola. After nine appearances for the Norwegians, as well as three for their reserve team in the 4. divisjon, González switched Norway for Italy by agreeing contract terms with Serie D's Fasano. He scored one goal in twenty-five matches for the club, as they placed eighth in a campaign that ended prematurely due to the COVID-19 pandemic. On 12 August 2020, González moved across the division to Taranto.

On 15 July 2022, González signed with Serie D club Trapani.

Career statistics
.

References

1991 births
Living people
Footballers from Buenos Aires
Argentine footballers
Association football defenders
Argentine expatriate footballers
Expatriate footballers in Costa Rica
Expatriate footballers in Norway
Expatriate footballers in Italy
Argentine expatriate sportspeople in Costa Rica
Argentine expatriate sportspeople in Norway
Argentine expatriate sportspeople in Italy
Primera Nacional players
Primera C Metropolitana players
Primera B Metropolitana players
Torneo Argentino B players
Torneo Federal A players
Liga FPD players
Norwegian Second Division players
Norwegian Fourth Division players
Serie D players
All Boys footballers
General Lamadrid footballers
Club Atlético Atlanta footballers
Deportivo Español footballers
Club de Regatas Bella Vista footballers
Villa Mitre footballers
Estudiantes de Buenos Aires footballers
Club Atlético Tigre footballers
Club Atlético Acassuso footballers
A.D. San Carlos footballers
Egersunds IK players
U.S.D. Città di Fasano players
Taranto F.C. 1927 players
Trapani Calcio players